Windows NTexplorer was a monthly UK trade magazine for IT professionals. Its online portal, complete with a digital version of the print publication, was launched in 1998 and is still available as an archive.

In August 2000, Duke Communications, the owner of Windows NTexplorer Magazine announced it would be sold to Penton Media and the magazine would be closed in late 2000, with the title becoming a digital only publication.

Windows NTexplorer Magazine's sister web sites include Paul Thurrott's SuperSite for Windows, SQL Server Pro, SharePoint Pro, Dev Pro, and myITforum.com.

References

External links

Defunct computer magazines published in the United Kingdom
Microsoft Windows magazines
Magazines established in 1998
Magazines disestablished in 2001
Magazines published in Manchester
Monthly magazines published in the United Kingdom
Online computer magazines
Online magazines published in the United Kingdom
Online magazines with defunct print editions
Professional and trade magazines